Z. maculata may refer to:

 Zantedeschia maculata, a plant native to southern Africa
 Zelleria maculata, an ermine moth
 Zomicarpella maculata, a plant native to Colombia